Khamavyurt (Xamavyurt; , Xaama-Yurt) is a rural locality (a selo) in Khasavyurtovsky District, Republic of Dagestan, Russia. The population was 3,178 as of 2010. There are 28 streets.

Geography 
Khamavyurt is located 19 km northwest of Khasavyurt (the district's administrative centre) by road. Tsiyab-Tsoloda is the nearest rural locality.

References 

Rural localities in Khasavyurtovsky District